The Sopron area plebiscite took place on 14-16 December 1921. In the plebiscite, the residents of an area of 257 km2, comprising Sopron and eight surrounding settlements, voted on whether to remain in Hungary or to join Austria. After World War I, that was the only plebiscite concerning disputed borders on  territory of the former Kingdom of Hungary that was permitted by the Entente.

Participant settlements 
The following settlements participated in the plebiscite. The Hungarian names are given, with their German counterparts in brackets: 

 Ágfalva (Agendorf)
 Balf (Wolfs) 
 Fertőboz (Holling)
 Fertőrákos (Kroisbach)
 Harka (Harkau) 
 Kópháza (Kohlnhof)
 Nagycenk (Zinkendorf)
 Sopron (Ödenburg)
 Sopronbánfalva (Wandorf)

Results 
26,879 people were eligible to vote in the plebiscite. 24,063 of them voted. 15,534 voted for Hungary, while 8,227 voted for Austria. 502 ballots were invalid. 

18,904 residents of Sopron had the right to vote in the plebiscite. (At the time of the plebiscite Sopron had 37,509 residents.) Here, with a turnout of 89.2%, a large majority (72.7%) voted for Hungary. However, in the 8 villages, the support for Austria was greater, with 5 villages voting for Austria. Only Nagycenk, Fertőboz and Kópháza voted for Hungary.

References 

Referendums in Hungary
Border polls
1921 referendums
Aftermath of World War I in Hungary
December 1921 events
Plebiscite